Ercall Magna is a civil parish in the district of Telford and Wrekin, Shropshire, England.  It contains 28 listed buildings that are recorded in the National Heritage List for England.  Of these, one is listed at Grade I, the highest of the three grades, two are at Grade II*, the middle grade, and the others are at Grade II, the lowest grade.  The parish contains the village of High Ercall, and smaller settlements including Roden and Rowton, and is almost entirely rural.  Most of the listed buildings are houses, farmhouses and farm buildings.  The other listed buildings include two churches, a churchyard wall, a former manor house, the remaining parts of a former Jacobean mansion, a former watermill and mill house, a mounting block, and a monument.


Key

Buildings

References

Citations

Sources

Lists of buildings and structures in Shropshire